This glossary of BDSM (an initialism for bondage, discipline, domination, submission, sadism, and masochism) terms defines terms commonly used in the BDSM community.

BDSM activities are described as play in BDSM terminology.

Etymology 
BDSM abbreviations have their origins in classified personal advertisements, where euphemisms for paraphilic and socially-disapproved practices were required by periodical editors to circumvent censorship and obscenity law.

The term BDSM is a portmanteau of initialisms intended to encompass all of the following activities:
 Bondage and discipline (B & D or B/D)
 Dominance and submission (D & S or D/s) (including "master and slave" role-playing scenarios and ongoing relationship structures)
 Sadism and masochism (S & M or S/M)

Capitalization conventions
Some people in the BDSM community begin dominant terms with an upper case, for example: Top, Master, Dom, Domme, etc., as well as to begin submissive terms with a lower case, even where normally incorrect, chiefly in acronyms and abbreviations, such as D/s for Dom/sub. Others are highly dismissive of this "slashy speak".

BDSM glossary

 24/7: A relationship in which protocols are in place continuously.
 Abrasion: Use of friction with a rough surface against the receptive partner. May be used to sensitize an area of skin.
 Adult Baby/Diaper Lover (ABDL): Adult babies receive gratification from role-playing an infant a form of ageplay. This can involve submission on the adult baby's part. Diaper lovers receive gratification from the wearing and often using of diapers. Whilst these two paraphilias are distinct, it is common that a person who enjoys one will also enjoy the other to some degree.
 Aftercare: The time after a BDSM scene or play session in which the participants calm down, discuss the previous events and their personal reactions to them, and slowly come back in touch with reality.
 BDSM: Bondage/Discipline, Dominance/Submission, Sadism/Masochism: a combined acronym often used as a catchall for anything in the kink scene.
 Bondage: Acts involving the physical restraint of a partner. Bondage typically refers to total restraint, but it can be limited to a particular body part, such as breast bondage.
 Bottom: One who receives physical sensation from a top in a scene; the receiving partner.
 Breast bondage: The act of tying breasts so that they are either flattened against the chest or so that they bulge.
 Breast torture: Torture of the breasts. 
 Breath control play: Restriction of oxygen to heighten sexual arousal and orgasm. Methods to achieve this include strangulation, suffocation, and smothering.
 Butt plug: A sex toy that is designed to be inserted into the rectum for sexual pleasure. They come in a variety of sizes; some can vibrate. Sometimes used in Petplay, with a tail attached.
 Chastity: A form of erotic sexual denial or orgasm denial whereby a person is prevented from access to, or stimulation of, their genitals, save at the whim or choice of their partner. Often by means of a device that prevents contact and is controlled by means of a lock operated by the partner.
 Cock and ball torture (CBT): Torture of the penis and testicles for sexual gratification.
 Collared: Submissive or slave who is owned, usually (but certainly not exclusively) in a loving intimate relationship. A dominant may have multiple persons collared. Also: a pup's status, as differentiated from a "stray".
 Collaring: The formal acceptance by a dominant of a sub's service. Also the ceremony when a dominant commits to a sub (much like a wedding or other contract).
 Contrapolar stimulation: "Hurts so good!” A type of physical stimulation that incorporates feeling of both pleasure and pain.
 Consensual non-consent: Play where the parties agree to roleplay nonconsensual activities, such as kidnapping or rape.
 Consent: Mutual agreement to terms of action as in a scene or ongoing BDSM relationship.
 D/s: Dominance/submission: play or relationships that involve a psychologically based power exchange.
 DDLG: Daddy Dom/Little Girl, a subset of Dominance and submission. The name of this lifestyle refers to the nurturing relationship between parent/child where the dom takes on the role of a parent figure and the sub of a little girl.
 Dungeon monitor: Dungeon Monitor (DM), a person who supervises the interactions between participants at a play party or dungeon to enforce house rules – essentially, the bouncer of a BDSM event. They may also help in basic ways such as giving water to participants.
 Dom: A person who exercises control (from dominant – contrasted with sub).
 Dominant: A person who exercises control – contrasted with submissive.
 Domme: Woman who exercises control (see also Dominatrix). Often associated with a particular brand of traditional femininity; many younger female dominants prefer to use the nongendered terms dom/dominant.
 Dom-space: The euphoric state of mind a dom may enter during a scene. May include an intensified perception of the scene.
 Dungeon: Usually refers to a room or area with BDSM equipment and play space.

 Edgeplay: SM play that involves a chance of harm, either physically or emotionally. Because the definition of edgeplay is subjective to the specific players (i.e., what is risky for one person may not be as risky for another), there is not a universal list of what is included in edgeplay. Examples may included bloodplay and gunplay.
 Enema play: Both women and men may experience sexual arousal from enemas finding them gratifying or sensual. Enemas are also used in sadomasochistic activities for erotic humiliation or for physical discomfort.
 Erotic humiliation: Humiliating someone during a sexual act. This act could be either verbal or physical for example, insulting a partner, making a partner display their private parts to a group of people, or even urinating or defecating on a partner. It can be a great source of pleasure for some people. There must be boundaries, safe words, and limits because without caution this play can destroy a relationship or a partner's self-esteem.
 Erotic sexual denial: Keeping another person aroused while delaying or preventing resolution of the feelings, to keep them in a continual state of anticipatory tension and inner conflict, and heightened sensitivity. (See also tease and denial and chastity.)
 Erotic spanking: The act of spanking another person for the sexual arousal or gratification of either or both parties. 
 Figging: Insertion of a piece of peeled ginger root into the anus, vagina, or, occasionally the urethra.
 Financial domination: (Also known as money slavery or findom) is a sexual fetish associated with a practice of dominance and submission, where a submissive (money slave, finsub, paypig, human ATM, or cash piggy) will give gifts and money to a financial dominant (money mistress/master, findomme/findom, money dom/domme or cash master/mistress).
 Fisting: Inserting a hand into the vagina or rectum. 
 Genitorture: Torture of the genitals.
 Golden showers: Urinating on, or being urinated on by, another person. 
 Good pain (1): Good pain and bad pain are terms used lightheartedly by BDSM practitioners, signifying that whilst BDSM may include an element (often quite pronounced) of consensual pain, there is a purpose to it, and some pain is consented to and accepted whilst other pain is not. "Good pain" is therefore pain that is mutually agreed, desired or permitted by the submissive partner to be experienced, and seen by them as of enjoyment or value.
 Good pain (2): Good pain and bad pain refer to perception of pain as pleasant vs. unpleasant. Sensations that non-practitioners imagine to be painful are instead perceived and described by BDSM practitioners as pleasurable or a good form of pain, in much the way that muscles after a workout at the gym may be sore, but in a good way. The transition of perception from "bad pain" to "good pain" may require a warm up beforehand.
 Gorean: A subgenre based upon the rituals and practices created within the world of Gor in the erotic novels by John Norman. Through separate from the BDSM community, the two communities may share similarities especially in master/slave relationships.
Gunplay: The practice of including actual (or simulated) firearms into a scene.
 Handkerchief codes: A code used to indicate to others one's area of interest in a sexual context, ex: a Handkerchief worn on the left indicates a top, on the right indicates a bottom. Generally used in an lgbt context. 
 Hard limits: What someone absolutely will not do; non-negotiable (as opposed to "soft limits").
 Hogtie: Tying up a submissive's wrists and ankles, fastening them together behind their back using physical restraints such as rope or cuffs.
 Impact play: Part of sensation play, dealing with impacts such as those from whips, riding crops, paddles, floggers, etc.
 Kinbaku: Literally means "tight binding.". Kinbaku is a Japanese style of bondage or BDSM which involves tying up the bottom using simple yet visually intricate patterns. Also can be referred to as shibari.
Kinbaku-bi: Literally means "beauty of tight binding."
 Kinky sex: Any sexual act that is generally considered to be unconventional.
 Klismaphilia See enema play.
 Knife play: Slow, methodical sensation of the bottom with the edges and points of knives, usually without cutting the skin. Fear of the weapon plays a large part in the stimulus of the bottom.
 Limits: What someone will not participate in (hard limits), or is hesitant to do so (soft limits).
 Masochism: Act of receiving pleasure from acts involving the receipt or infliction of pain or humiliation.
 Masochist: Person who enjoys pain, often sexually.
 Master/slave: A consensual relationship in which one person receives control (the Master) when given it by another (the slave) for mutual benefit with a focus on service and obedience. The slave will often accept a collar from their Master to show that they are owned.
 MDLB: Mommy Domme/Little Boy, the female led version of DDLG, a subset of Dominance and submission. While this lifestyle may or may not involve ageplay, the name refers to the nurturing relationship of parent/child or teacher/student.
 Mummification: Full body bondage that completely immobilizes the one wrapped up.
 Munch: A group of people that practice BDSM meeting at a "vanilla" place in street-appropriate attire. Sometimes this is a club. One might see an announcement like, "This weekend's munch is at Denny's".
 Needle play: Temporary piercings done with sterile needles of varying gauges, usually only for the duration of a scene.
 Nose torture: A traditionally Japanese form of BDSM often involving nose hooks.
 Pain slut: A person who enjoys receiving a heavy degree of pain.
 Pegging: A sexual practice in which a woman penetrates a man's anus with a strap-on dildo.
 Play party: A BDSM event involving many people engaging in scenes.  Generally there is an area for drinking and socializing, an area for changing into more appropriate attire (such as fetishwear), and an area for "play" or sexually arousing activities. 
 Ponyboy or Ponygirl: A sub dressed in a pony outfit, with mouth bit and anal plug with a tail. They are told to prance or behave like a pony.
 ProDom: Male professional dominant (charges money).
 ProDomme: Female professional dominant (charges money).
 Pup-play: Play where the sub acts like a puppy, has association with the gay leather scene.
 Pussy torture: Torture of the vulva or vagina for sexual gratification.
 RACK: Risk Aware Consensual Kink, describes a philosophical view that is generally permissive of certain risky sexual behaviors, as long as the participants are fully aware of the risks.
 Rhaphanidosis: Insertion of a piece of radish into the anus.
 Rope bondage: Tying someone with ropes. An example is Japanese kinbaku.
 Sadism: The act of receiving pleasure from inflicting pain.
 Sadist: A person who enjoys inflicting pain, usually sexually.
 Safe, sane and consensual (SSC): A credo used by some BDSM practitioners to determine the appropriateness of BDSM play which focuses on making sure that everything is based on safe activities, that all participants are of sufficiently sound mind to consent, and that all participants do consent.  Sometimes contrasted to RACK (risk aware consensual kink).
 Safeword: A codeword a bottom can use to force BDSM activity to be decreased in intensity or be stopped outright – used especially in scenes which may involve consensual force.
 Scat play: Feces play.
 Scene: Refers to the setting and participation of a bdsm activity.  
 Sensation play: class of activities meant to impart physical sensations upon a partner, as opposed to mental forms of erotic play such as power exchange or sexual roleplaying.
 Service submission: A person who enjoys performing a service in a sexual or BDSM environment.
 Slave: A submissive who consensually gives up total control of one or more aspects of their life to another person (their Master).
 Soft limits: Something that someone is hesitant to do or is nervous to try. They can sometimes be talked into the activity, but it is preferable if it is negotiated into a scene at a trial stage or at beginner level.
 Squick: The uncomfortable feeling someone may get when they hear or see certain kinky activities. It can also refer to someone who has no interest in the activity – it "squicks them out" – but who has no prejudice against the play or people who participate. It is believed that the word is a combination of "squirm" and "icky" and is used to imply an uncomfortable feeling mixed with disgust. The term is used instead of disgust because that word implies moral repugnance to the act.
 Subdrop: A physical condition, often with cold- or flu-like symptoms, experienced by a submissive after an intense session of BDSM play. This can last for as long as a week, and is best prevented by aftercare immediately after the session.
 Submissive (or "sub" for short): A person that gives up control either all the time or for a specified period (not to be confused with "bottom" or "slave").
 Subspace: A "natural high" that a sub (or bottom) experiences during a scene or when being controlled. The sub may feel disconnected from time, space, and/or their body, and may have limited ability to communicate. It is critical that a Dom/top take responsibility for the sub/bottom and be aware of their sub's well-being if they are in subspace. Long-term dominance and submission relationships without impact play may alternatively define subspace as 'a mental state where the submissive feels a deep emotional resonance or connection with the dom'.  
 Switch: Someone who likes being both dominant and submissive, either in one scene or on different occasions.
 Tit torture: The act of causing deliberate physical pain to the breasts or nipples.
 TNG: The Next Generation. A tag commonly used by groups and organizations which cater to younger people involved in BDSM, typically ages 18–35.
 Top: The person "doing the action" (contrasted with bottom – the person receiving the action). Not to be confused with Dom which is the person who "puts the scene together". A male Dom could enjoy CBT and tell a sub what they are to do. In this case the Top is the submissive (following the direction of the Dom) and the bottom is the Dom (receiving the attention of the top).
 Topping from the bottom: When a bottom purports to be a submissive but nonetheless tries to overdirect the top in a manner not fitting to the scene or relationship.
 TPE (Total Power Exchange): A relationship where the dominant or owner has complete authority and influence over the submissive's life, making the majority of decisions.

 Training: Either referring to a short period of time, or an ongoing effort of the dominant teaching the submissive how to behave for their own preferences.
 Vanilla: Someone who is not into BDSM. Alternatively, sexual behavior which does not encompass BDSM activity.
 Wax play: The top drips hot wax on the bottom.
 WIITWD: What It Is That We Do. A broad term referring to all forms of alternative sexuality.

In addition, high protocol refers to groups or individuals that adhere to strict roles and role-based rules of conduct, whereas low protocol refers to groups or individuals that are more relaxed. Old Guard now usually refers to high protocol groups, particularly gay leather BDSM groups; people who use this phrase may be romanticizing a perception of leather history: see Old Guard leather.

See also
Bondage positions and methods
Index of BDSM articles
List of BDSM equipment
Outline of BDSM

References

 
BDSM terms
Wikipedia glossaries using unordered lists